Ellery Channing "Doc" Huntington (June 18, 1865 – September 18, 1945) was an American college athletics coach, administrator, and professor.  He served as the Director of Physical Education and Athletics at Colgate University from 1900 until his retirement in 1935. Huntington was also the head basketball coach at Colgate from 1900 to 1913, compiling a record of 104–74.

Huntington was born on a farm in Wisconsin. He graduated from Amherst College in 1888 and earned a master's degree from the University of Nashville in 1900. His son, Ellery Huntington Jr., was an All-American quarterback and football coach at Colgate. Huntington died on September 18, 1945 at the age of 80 after suffering a heart attack at his home in Hamilton, New York.

References

External links
 Colgate University Athletics Hall of Honor profile
 

1865 births
1945 deaths
Colgate Raiders men's basketball coaches
Colgate Raiders athletic directors
Colgate Raiders baseball coaches
Colgate University faculty
College track and field coaches in the United States
Amherst College alumni
University of Nashville alumni
People from Hamilton, New York
People from Medina (town), Wisconsin
Basketball coaches from Wisconsin
Baseball coaches from Wisconsin